The Autovía B-21 is a Spanish motorway that is an access road to the Port of Barcelona from the A-2 and the B-20 (Ronda de Dalt).

References 

B-21
Transport in Catalonia
Transport in Barcelona